The siege of Tampico occurred during the Mexican Federalist War between the 26 May and 4 June 1839. The insurgents under the command of General Ignacio Escalada were besieged by Centralist forces under the command of General Mariano Arista. Escalada surrendered on the 4 June. The loss of the port was a major blow to the insurgency.

Notes

References

Further reading

1839 in Mexico
Conflicts in 1839